Play for Japan: The Album is a benefit music project for the 2011 Tōhoku earthquake survivors featuring video game musicians and composers. It was conceived by Akira Yamaoka of Silent Hill fame and was released digitally on iTunes and Amazon on July 15, 2011.

Track list
 Nobuko Toda – "Reminiscence"
 Laura Shigihara – "Jump"
 Penka Kouneva – "White Cloud"
 Tommy Tallarico – "Greater Lights"
 Mitsuto Suzuki – "Play for You"
 Jason Graves – "Necromancer"
 Woody Jackson – "Moshi Moshi"
 Akira Yamaoka – "Ex Animo"
 Sean Murray – "The Temple Stone"
 Laura Karpman in collaboration with Lisbeth Scott – "Pine Wind Sound"
 Nobuo Uematsu – "Every New Morning"
 Bear McCreary – "Maverick Regeneration"
 Hip Tanaka – "HVC-1384"
 Chance Thomas – "Rise Up"
 Arthur Inasi – "We Are One"
 Inon Zur – "Remember"
 Koji Kondo – "Super Mario Medley"
 Yasunori Mitsuda – "Dimension Break"

2011 albums